Marie-Odile Raymond (born 13 December 1973) is a Canadian former cross-country skier who competed in the 1998 Winter Olympics.

Cross-country skiing results
All results are sourced from the International Ski Federation (FIS).

Olympic Games

References

1973 births
Living people
Canadian female cross-country skiers
Olympic cross-country skiers of Canada
Cross-country skiers at the 1998 Winter Olympics
20th-century Canadian women